Simeon Kosanović (born 26 August 1933 in ) is a former Croatian basketball and handball player.

He is the brother of Željko Kosanović.

Honours

As player
Primorje
Croatian Primorje League - Rijeka group (1): 1957-58
Primorje and Istra Regional League (2): 1958-59, 1959-60

Kvarner
Regional League of Rijeka and Karlovac (1): 1963-64

Partizan Zamet
Regional League of Primorje and Karlovac (1): 1965-66

As coach
ŽRK Partizan Zamet
Regional league of Primorje and Istra (1): 1969-70

Sources
Petar Orgulić - 50 godina rukometa u Rijeci (2005), Adria public

References

Yugoslav male handball players
Croatian handball coaches
RK Zamet players
RK Zamet coaches
ŽRK Zamet coaches
People from Karlovac County
Handball players from Rijeka
RK Kvarner players
1934 births
Living people